Jérémy Grain (born 21 October 1994) is a French professional footballer who plays as a striker for Championnat National 2 club Trélissac.

Career
A product of the Niort youth system, Grain made his senior debut for the club on 15 November 2014 in the 2–1 win against Chauvigny in the seventh round of the Coupe de France, coming on as a substitute for Florian Martin. He went on to make his first league appearance later that same season, replacing Djiman Koukou in the 1–3 home defeat to Créteil on 30 January 2015. Grain spent the second half of the 2015–16 season on loan at Fréjus Saint-Raphaël, where he scored four goals in 17 league appearances. He was released by Niort in the summer of 2016.

On 4 July 2016, Grain joined Championnat National side Boulogne on a free transfer. After a promising season with Boulogne, he signed for  Championnat National 2 side Sedan. 

In August 2018 Grain moved to Belgium, joining Belgian First Amateur Division side Excelsior Virton. He returned to France, with Lyon-Duchère, in August 2019, signing a one-year deal with an option for an extra year.

In July 2021, he signed with Bastia-Borgo. In January 2022, he joined Le Puy.

Career statistics

Honours
Virton
 Belgian First Amateur Division: 2018–19
Le Puy

 Championnat National 2: 2021–22

References

External links
 
 

1994 births
Living people
People from Villeneuve-sur-Lot
Sportspeople from Lot-et-Garonne
French footballers
Association football forwards
Chamois Niortais F.C. players
ÉFC Fréjus Saint-Raphaël players
US Boulogne players
CS Sedan Ardennes players
R.E. Virton players
Lyon La Duchère players
FC Rouen players
FC Bastia-Borgo players
Le Puy Foot 43 Auvergne players
Trélissac FC players
Ligue 2 players
Championnat National 3 players
Championnat National players
Championnat National 2 players
Belgian Third Division players
Footballers from Nouvelle-Aquitaine